Tina Manning (January 18, 1950 – February 12, 1979) was a Paiute-Shoshone water rights activist and wife of John Trudell. Manning was the daughter of Arthur and Leah Hicks Manning. Her father had served as the tribal chairman of the Shoshone-Paiute Tribes of the Duck Valley Indian Reservation in northern Nevada. She graduated from Bacone College in Muskogee, Oklahoma.

On February 12, 1979, Manning perished along with her unborn baby Josiah Hawk, three other children; Ricarda Star, Sunshine Karma, and Eli Changing Sun, and her mother, in a house fire on the Duck Valley Reservation. Her father was the only survivor. The cause of the fire was never determined, but it was considered suspicious and deemed probable arson by John Trudell and others, as it took place the day after Trudell led a protest against the F.B.I. in Washington, D.C.

References

Sources
Hoxie, Fredrick E., Mancall, Peter C. and Merrell, James (2001). American Nations: Encounters in Indian Country, 1850 to the Present. London: Routledge. 
 Mankiller, Wilma and Wallis, Michael. Mankiller: A Chief and Her People. New York: St. Martin's Press, 1999. .
Rowell, Andrew (1996). Green Backlash: Global Subversion of the Environment Movement. London: Routledge. 

1979 deaths
Paiute people
Shoshone people
Native American activists
People from Nye County, Nevada
20th-century Native Americans
20th-century Native American women
1950 births